The Henry Coffin House was designed by Tourtellotte & Co. and constructed in Boise, Idaho, USA, in 1905. The house is an early example of Colonial Revival architectural design by Tourtellotte, who lived across the street. It was included as a contributing property in the Fort Street Historic District on November 12, 1982. It was individually listed on the National Register of Historic Places on November 17, 1982.

A native of Annapolis, Indiana, Henry N. Coffin became a clerk at the First National Bank in Leavenworth, Kansas, then a clerk at the First National Bank in Lawrence, Kansas. He served as assistant treasurer of the State of Kansas prior to moving to Boise in 1890. In Boise he became the cashier of the First National Bank, and he helped to organize the Boise Bank of Commerce, holding the position of cashier. Coffin was elected as State Treasurer of Idaho, 1903–1904, then reelected, 1905–1906.

References

External links

Houses completed in 1905
Houses in Boise, Idaho
Colonial Revival architecture in Idaho
National Register of Historic Places in Ada County, Idaho
Houses on the National Register of Historic Places in Idaho
Individually listed contributing properties to historic districts on the National Register in Idaho
1905 establishments in Idaho